Cyclacanthus coccineus is a type species in its genus of flowering plants and is included in the family Acanthaceae.  The species found in Indo-China and was originally described by S.Moore in Thailand.  In Vietnam it is found in southern provinces, between Khánh Hoà and  Đồng Nai, where its name is luân rô đỏ.

References

External links
 Images on Flickr (by Nam Nguyễn)

Acanthaceae
Flora of Indo-China
Flora of Thailand
Flora of Vietnam